The  Haddush Addi massacre was a mass extrajudicial killing that took place in Haddush Addi in the Tigray Region of Ethiopia during the Tigray War, on 1 April 2021. Haddush Addi is a village adjacent to Wukro Maray in woreda Tahtay Maychew, Central zone of Tigray.

Massacre
The Eritrean Defence Forces (EDF) killed around 20 civilians in Haddush Addi (Central Tigray) on 1 April 2021, particularly in hamlet Grzla.

Typical massacres committed by Ethiopian and Eritrean soldiers in the Tigray war are (1) revenge when they lose a battle; (2) to terrorise and extract information about whereabouts of TPLF leaders; (3) murder of suspected family members of TDF fighters; and (4) terrorising the Tigray society as a whole such as in case of mass killings in churches.
The massacres in Wukro Maray and surroundings were carried out by Ethiopian and Eritrean forces, while being defeated by TDF.

Reactions
After months of denial by the Ethiopian authorities that massacres occurred in Tigray, a joint investigation by OHCHR and the Ethiopian Human Rights Commission was announced in March 2021.

While the Ethiopian government promised that Eritrean troops will be pulled out from Tigray, the Eritrean government denies any participation in warfare in Tigray, let alone in massacres.

See also 
Tisha massacre
May Atsmi massacres

References

External links
World Peace Foundation: Starving Tigray

Massacres committed by Eritrea
2021 massacres of the Tigray War
April 2021 crimes in Africa
Extrajudicial killings in Ethiopia